"The Woman in Me" is a song written by Susan Marie Thomas, and recorded by American country music artist Crystal Gayle.  It was released in October 1981 as the first single from the album Hollywood, Tennessee.  The song reached number 3 on the Billboard Hot Country Singles & Tracks chart, remaining there for three weeks.  "The Woman in Me" did well on Adult Contemporary chart and was a minor crossover pop hit.

Chart performance

References

1981 singles
Crystal Gayle songs
Song recordings produced by Allen Reynolds
Columbia Records singles
1981 songs